In semi-Riemannian geometry, the Bel decomposition, taken with respect to a specific timelike congruence, is a way of breaking up the Riemann tensor of a pseudo-Riemannian manifold into lower order tensors with properties similar to the electric field and magnetic field.  Such a decomposition was partially described by Alphonse Matte in 1953 and by Lluis Bel in 1958.

This decomposition is particularly important in general relativity. This is the case of four-dimensional Lorentzian manifolds, for which there are only three pieces with simple properties and individual physical interpretations.

Decomposition of the Riemann tensor 
In four dimensions the Bel decomposition of the Riemann tensor, with respect to a timelike unit vector field , not necessarily geodesic or hypersurface orthogonal, consists of three pieces:
 the electrogravitic tensor 
 Also known as the tidal tensor. It can be physically interpreted as giving the tidal stresses on small bits of a material object (which may also be acted upon by other physical forces), or the tidal accelerations of a small cloud of test particles in a vacuum solution or electrovacuum solution.
 the magnetogravitic tensor 
 Can be interpreted physically as a specifying possible spin-spin forces on spinning bits of matter, such as spinning test particles.
 the topogravitic tensor 
 Can be interpreted as representing the sectional curvatures for the spatial part of a frame field.

Because these are all transverse (i.e. projected to the spatial hyperplane elements orthogonal to our timelike unit vector field), they can be represented as linear operators on three-dimensional vectors, or as three-by-three real matrices.  They are respectively symmetric, traceless, and symmetric (6,8,6 linearly independent components, for a total of 20).  If we write these operators as E, B, L respectively, the principal invariants of the Riemann tensor are obtained as follows:
  is the trace of E2 +  L2 - 2 B BT,
  is the trace of B ( E - L ),
  is the trace of E L - B2.

See also

Bel–Robinson tensor
Ricci decomposition
Tidal tensor
Papapetrou–Dixon equations
Curvature invariant

References

Lorentzian manifolds
Tensors in general relativity